Mihhail Kõlvart (born 24 November 1977) is an Estonian politician. He is the current mayor of Tallinn, Estonia, a position he has held since April 2019, after the resignation of Taavi Aas.

Life 
Kõlvart was born in Kyzylorda, Kazakh SSR, to an Estonian father, Ülo Kõlvart, and Liidia Kõlvart (née Shek), who was of Chinese and Korean ancestry. The couple met while they were both studying at Moscow State University. His father is the founder of the Estonian National Taekwondo Association in 1992 and was its first president from 1992 to 1996. His mother was a teacher. He moved with his parents to Estonia when he was three years old. Kõlvart has a daughter with Jaana Kalinistova.

He graduated from Tallinn Secondary School No. 15 in 1995. He studied jurisprudence and later business law at the International College of Applied Social Sciences LEX in Tallinn.

Athletic career 
Kõlvart made a name for himself as a top athlete nationally and internationally in the disciplines of boxing, kickboxing and Taekwondo, of which he has a black belt in (5th dan). Starting in 1993, he worked in Tallinn as a Taekwondo coach. In 1996, he was elected President of the Estonian National Taekwondo Association. In 2016, he became a member of the Executive Committee of the Estonian Olympic Committee. In 2017 was elected as a president of Estonian Taekwondo Federation. In 2022 obtained a honorary 7 dan from Kukkiwon.

Political career 
From 1999 to 2002, Kõlvart was a member of the district council of the Lasnamäe district of Tallinn. In 2008, he joined the Estonian Centre Party. In 2009, he was elected to the Tallinn city council. He was particularly committed to youth and sport and the rights of ethnic minorities in Tallinn, and as such, has made him popular with the Russian-speaking minority of Tallinn. He was elected to the Riigikogu in 2011, of which he was a member of until 2019. In April 2011, he resigned as a deputy mayor of Tallinn to serve in the Riigikogu. Later on, from 2017 to 2019, he was the chairman of the Tallinn City Council. He resigned in April 2019, as he was elected mayor of Tallinn on 11 April after the resignation of mayor Taavi Aas to serve in the cabinet of Jüri Ratas. On 30 September 2019, he was made an honorary citizen of Seoul, South Korea by Seoul's mayor Park Won-soon. From April 2022 honorary doctor of Shinhan University.

References 

1977 births
Estonian Centre Party politicians
Estonian male boxers
Estonian male kickboxers
Estonian people of Chinese descent
Estonian people of Korean descent
Living people
Mayors of Tallinn
Members of the Riigikogu, 2011–2015
Members of the Riigikogu, 2023–2027
People from Kyzylorda
Politicians from Tallinn
Sportspeople from Tallinn
Estonian expatriates in Kazakhstan